Guillaume Lemay-Thivierge (born February 28, 1976) is a Canadian actor and film producer best known for major roles in Quebec films Nitro and The 3 L'il Pigs (Les 3 p'tits cochons) in 2007.

Profile
After participating in a first commercial ad at the age of 6, Thivierge's career started very early at the age of eight when he had his first minor television and film roles on Épopée rock, Manon, Les annees des reves, Le Matou and La Dame en couleurs in 1984 and 1985.

However, it was in the mid-2000s where Thivierge started to play lead roles in Nitro as well as in the 3 L'il pigs, two of the biggest box-office Quebec hits in 2007. Another notable role was in Lance et Compte: Le Revanche in 2006, where he played a paraplegic lawyer defending one of the fictional National de Quebec hockey who was charged with second degree murder and later for involuntary homicide following an on-ice incident where a player died from his injuries following a check from the accused player.

During his lengthy acting career, Thivierge participated in a total of 30 films and television series including Le Négociateur, Casino, Les Immortels, Chambres en Ville and Ramdam. In addition, in 2004, Thivierge produced the film, Trois petits coups and also starred in theater and musical plays, while he occasionally co-hosted radio shows such as the morning show C't'encore drôle on CKMF-FM in Montreal.

In 2021 he was the host of Chanteurs masqués, the Quebec adaptation of the Masked Singer franchise.

Personal life 
Thivierge was married to Quebec actress Mariloup Wolfe whom he met in 2001. the couple have two children, Manoé and Miró . Thivierge also has a daughter, Charlie, from a previous relationship. Mariloup and Guillaume split up on November 13, 2015 after a 14 years relationship. His fourth child,Theodore, was born in 2017 from his current relationship with former Star Académie contestant Emily Begin.
Thivierge's favorite hobby is skydiving.

Filmography

Television
 Épopée rock (1984)
 Manon (1985)
 Chambres en ville (1989)
 Lance et Compte:Le Crime de Lulu (1991)
 Sur la piste  (1995–1997)
 Radio Enfer (2000–2001)
 Avoir su (2001)
 Varian's War (2001)
 Rumeurs (2002)
 Le Négociateur (2005)
 Trudeau II: Maverick in the Making (2005)
 Ramdam (2001–02, 2006)
 Casino (2006)
 Lance et Compte: Le Revanche (2006)
 Bye-Bye (2008)
 Taxi 0-22 (2009)
 Lance et compte: Le grand duel (2009)
 30 Vies (2012)
 Trauma (2013)
 Chanteurs masqués (2021) - host

Films
 The Years of Dreams and Revolt (Les Années de rêves) - 1984
 The Alley Cat (Le Matou) - 1985
 The Dame in Colour (La Dame en couleurs) - 1985
 Wild Thing - 1987
 Brother André (Le Frère André) - 1987
 Deaf to the City (Le sourd dans la ville) - 1987
 La Florida - 1993
 Louis 19, King of the Airwaves (Louis 19, le roi des ondes) - 1994
 Les Immortels - 2002
 Trois petits coups - 2004
 Spymate - 2006
 Nitro - 2007
 The 3 L'il Pigs (Les 3 p'tits cochons) - 2007
 The Broken Line (La ligne brisée) - 2008
 Detour (Détour) - 2009
 Free Fall (Les Pieds dans le vide) - 2009
 Toy Story 3 - 2010: voice of Ken in the French dub
 Thrill of the Hills (Frisson des collines) - 2011
 Nitro Rush - 2016
 The 3 L'il Pigs 2 (Les 3 p'tits cochons 2) - 2016

Producer
 Trois petits coups (2004)

Awards and nominations
In 2006, Thivierge received a Gemini Award nomination for his role in Casino, while he won an award for BestSupporting Actor role in a Children's Series for his role in Ramdam.

References

External links
 (FR) Official Website of Guillaume Lemay-Thivierge
 

1976 births
Male actors from Quebec
Canadian male child actors
Canadian male film actors
Canadian male television actors
Canadian television hosts
French Quebecers
Living people
People from Saint-Jérôme